The Queen Elizabeth II Bridge carries the Tyne and Wear Metro between Newcastle upon Tyne and Gateshead over the River Tyne in North East England. The line is in tunnels on either side of the river and only emerges into open air to cross the bridge.

History

The bridge was developed as part of the Tyne and Wear Metro system, for which it was purpose-built. It was designed by W. A. Fairhurst & Partners, and constructed by Cementation Construction Ltd. and the Cleveland Bridge & Engineering Company at a cost of £4.9 million.  The two sections of the bridge were built simultaneously from each bank and eventually met in the centre in August 1978.  It was officially opened by Queen Elizabeth II on 6 November 1981, nine days before regular Metro service began. It is similar to Ballachulish Bridge on the A82 which opened in 1975, which was also built by the Cleveland Bridge & Engineering Company.

It was one of two major bridges built specifically for the Tyne and Wear Metro, the other being the Byker Viaduct crossing the Ouseburn valley.

Nocturne artwork 
In 2006, Nexus, operators of the Metro, commissioned artist Nayan Kulkarni to install a huge artwork on the bridge. The artwork, Nocturne, sees the bridge painted two distinct tones of blue, while at night, 140 Lumiflood 36 LED lighting units create an ever-changing pattern of colours based on photographs submitted by members of the public.

Nocturne was completed and opened on 26 April 2007 and means that all five main bridges across the Tyne between Gateshead and Newcastle have unique lighting schemes. However, as of 2021 the lighting system is not operational, with Nexus citing operational costs.

References

Further reading

External links
 

Railway bridges in Tyne and Wear
Tyne and Wear Metro
Bridges completed in 1978
Crossings of the River Tyne